Mostafa Errebbah (born 1 August 1971 in Douar Krazza) is a Moroccan-born Italian long-distance runner who specialized in the 5000 metres.

Biography
He competed at the 2000 World Half Marathon Championships for Morocco. He then became an Italian citizen in January 2001, and finished fifteenth at the 2001 World Half Marathon Championships. He also competed at the 2001 World Half Marathon Championships with less success.
He's married with Daniela Melotti since 1998 and they have two children.

Doping ban
In November 2004 Errebbah tested positive for the anabolic steroid Stanozolol. He was subsequently banned from sport from 31 May 2005 to 30 May 2007.

Achievements

Personal bests
5000 metres - 13:59.4 min (2001)
10,000 metres - 28:49.37 min (2001)
Half marathon - 1:02:19 hrs (2000, 2001)
Marathon - 2:12:22 hrs (2002)

References

External links

1971 births
Living people
Italian male long-distance runners
Moroccan male long-distance runners
Moroccan emigrants to Italy
Italian sportspeople of African descent
Doping cases in athletics
Italian sportspeople in doping cases
Naturalised citizens of Italy
People from Ksar el-Kebir